André Billoux (1928–1980) was a French politician. He served as a member of the National Assembly from 1973 to 1980, representing Tarn.

References

1928 births
1980 deaths
People from Tarn (department)
Politicians from Occitania (administrative region)
Socialist Party (France) politicians
Deputies of the 5th National Assembly of the French Fifth Republic
Deputies of the 6th National Assembly of the French Fifth Republic